Pantydia andersoni is a species of moth of the family Erebidae first described by Rudolf Felder and Alois Friedrich Rogenhofer in 1874. It is found in South Africa and Zambia.

References

Moths described in 1874
Pantydia